John Smith Thach (April 19, 1905 – April 15, 1981) was a World War II Naval Aviator, air combat tactician, and United States Navy admiral. Thach developed the Thach Weave, a combat flight formation which could counter enemy fighters of superior performance, and later the big blue blanket, an aerial defense against kamikaze attacks.

Early career
John S. Thach was born in Pine Bluff, Arkansas, on April 19, 1905. He graduated from the United States Naval Academy in 1927 and spent two years serving in battleships, before becoming a Naval Aviator in early 1930. Thach spent the next decade serving as a test pilot and instructor and establishing a reputation as an expert in aerial gunnery.

World War II

In early 1940, Thach was placed in command of Fighting Squadron Three (VF-3). There he met a young ensign just out of flight school, Edward O'Hare, later a Medal of Honor recipient. Thach made O'Hare his wingman and taught him everything he knew. At the United States Navy fleet gunnery competition at the end of 1940, eight of the 16 VF-3 pilots qualified for the gunnery "E" award ("excellence").

Later Thach developed a fighter combat tactic known as the Thach Weave. This tactic enabled American fighter aircraft to hold their own against the more maneuverable Mitsubishi A6M Zero, the primary Imperial Japanese Navy fighter aircraft.

On the morning of June 4, Thach led a six-plane sortie from VF-3, escorting twelve Douglas TBD Devastators of VT-3 led by Lieutenant Commander Lance Massey from Yorktown, when they discovered the main Japanese carrier fleet. They were immediately attacked by 15 to 20 Japanese fighters. Thach decided to use his namesake maneuver, marking its first combat usage. Although outnumbered and outmaneuvered, Thach managed to shoot down three Zeros and a wingman accounted for another, at the cost of one Grumman F4F Wildcat.

After Midway, Thach was assigned to instruct other pilots in combat tactics. The United States Navy pulled its best combat pilots out of action to train newer pilots, while the Japanese kept their best pilots in combat. As the war progressed, the Japanese Navy lost their experienced pilots due to attrition and had no well-trained replacements, while the United States was able to improve the general fighting ability of their own personnel. When the Japanese resorted to the feared Kamikaze suicide attacks, Thach developed the "big blue blanket" system to provide an adequate defense.

Later in the war, Commander Thach became operations officer to Vice Admiral John S. McCain Sr., commander of the Fast Carrier Task Force. Thach was also present at the formal Japanese surrender aboard the battleship  on September 2, 1945, in Tokyo Bay.

Thach was a flying ace, having been credited with shooting down six enemy aircraft during World War II.

Post–World War II

He was promoted to rear admiral in 1955.

In 1958 and 1959, Thach was placed in command of an antisubmarine development unit, "Task Group Alpha", with the aircraft carrier  serving as his flagship. He subsequently appeared on the cover of Time magazine on September 1, 1958, for his contributions to anti-submarine warfare (ASW), which was a primary focus at the time in the ongoing Cold War. An annual award was later established in his name for presentation to the top ASW squadron in the navy.

Thach was promoted to vice admiral in 1960 and served as the Deputy Chief of Naval Operations for Air in the Pentagon, where he presided over development of the A-7 Corsair II, among other naval aviation programs. As Commander in Chief, United States Naval Forces Europe, starting in 1965, he pinned on his fourth star as a full admiral, retiring from the Navy in May 1967 from that position.

The Arkansas Aviation Historical Society inducted Thach into the Arkansas Aviation Hall of Fame in 1981.

Thach died on April 15, 1981, in Coronado, California, four days before his 76th birthday, and was buried at Fort Rosecrans National Cemetery in San Diego.

The frigate  was named in his honor.

Personal life
Thach and his wife Madalynn had four children.

Decorations

Gallery

References
Notes

Bibliography

External links

 Time Magazine Cover Photo (Time Magazine Archives Site)
 "The Goblin Killers" – TIME – Monday, September 1, 1958
 Fighter Tactics

1905 births
1981 deaths
United States Navy personnel of the Korean War
United States Navy personnel of World War II
American test pilots
American World War II flying aces
Battle of Midway
Burials at Fort Rosecrans National Cemetery
People from Pine Bluff, Arkansas
Recipients of the Navy Distinguished Service Medal
Recipients of the Legion of Merit
Recipients of the Navy Cross (United States)
Recipients of the Silver Star
United States Naval Academy alumni
United States Naval Aviators
United States Navy admirals
United States Navy pilots of World War II